Hexaplex fulvescens, the giant eastern murex or giant Atlantic murex or tawny murex, is a species of sea snail, a marine gastropod mollusk in the family Muricidae, the murex snails or rock snails.

Distribution
This species is native to the western Atlantic Ocean from North Carolina to Cape Canaveral, Florida and it is also present in the Gulf of Mexico from Florida west to Texas.

Habitat
These quite uncommon sea snails live at depths of 0 to 80 m. 
In fact they commonly can be found in deeper waters, 
but they can also be found in shallow inshore waters.
Commercial scallop operations out of Florida sometimes trawl this species 
in 100 - 120 feet depth.

Description
These snails are massive and spinose and they are the largest muricid snails of the Western Atlantic (hence the common name). They have several straight or bifurcate spines arranged in 6-10 radial rows with spiraling ridges. Snail surface may be whitish, grayish or pale brown, the aperture is oval with crenulate edges. The siphonal canal is short.

Biology
Hexaplex fulvescens are active predators on other mollusks (mussels, oysters and clams). They lay their eggs in capsules attached under rocks.

References

 Kiener, L.-C., 1842-43 Genre Rocher (Murex), Linné. Volume 7. In: Spécies général et iconographie des coquilles vivantes. Famille des canalifères, p. 130 pp

Bibliography
 G. E. Radwin - Murex Shells of the World: An Illustrated Guide to the Muricidae
 National Audubon Society Field Guide to North American Seashells
 Turgeon, D. D., J. F. Quinn Jr., A. E. Bogan, E. V. Coan, F. G. Hochberg, W. G. Lyons, et al. (1998) Common and scientific names of aquatic invertebrates from the United States and Canada: Mollusks, 2nd ed., American Fisheries Society Special Publication 26

Muricinae
Gastropods described in 1834